The 2022 J.League Cup final was an association football match between Cerezo Osaka and Sanfrecce Hiroshima on 22 October 2022 at Japan National Stadium. It was the 30th edition J.League Cup, organised by the J.League. Cerezo Osaka were making their third J.League Cup final appearance after winning the competition in 2017 and finishing runners-up in 2021. Sanfrecce Hiroshima had previously appeared in two J.League cup finals but were beaten on both occasions in 2010 and 2014.

Prior to the game, a moment of silence was held to honor the death of former Sanfrecce Hiroshima player Masato Kudo, who had died a day before from complications of brain surgery.

Yudai Yamamoto was the referee for the match, which was played in front of 39,608 spectators. After a goalless first half, Cerezo Osaka scored after half time thanks to Mutsuki Kato and held their lead, until a red card was given to Matej Jonjić after striking Sanfrecce player Nassim Ben Khalifa, which put in Pieros Sotiriou. Sotiriou then scored on a spot kick with three minutes left in stoppage time, then scored again with barely any time left in stoppage in the 101st minute on a corner kick by Makoto Mitsuta, stealing the win from Cerezo Osaka.

As winners, Sanfrecce Hiroshima earned the right to play against the winners of the 2022 Copa Sudamericana in the J.League Cup / Copa Sudamericana Championship.

Teams

Route to the final
The tournament consisted of all 18 J1 League teams as well as the top two relegated teams from the 2021 league, beginning with a home-and-away round-robin group stage consisting of four groups of four teams. The top two teams of each group would then advance to a two-legged play-off stage. The winners of the play-offs would then be entered into a final knockout stage, alongside four teams that received byes due to their commitments in the 2022 AFC Champions League group stage.

Match

Details

Statistics

References

External links 
 2022ＪリーグYBCルヴァンカップ 

  
J.League Cup
2022 in Japanese football
Cerezo Osaka matches
Sanfrecce Hiroshima matches
2022 in Asian football
2022 in Japanese sport